Foreskin Man is a comic book created by Matthew Hess to protest against circumcision. The comic centers around Foreskin Man, a superhero who saves babies from being circumcised and fights their would-be circumcisers.

Foreskin Man was created by Matthew Hess, the author of a proposed bill to ban medically unnecessary circumcisions of minors, during a 2010-2011 campaign to ban this procedure in San Francisco. The comic received criticism from advocates on both sides of the circumcision debate for its alleged use of anti-Semitic imagery.

Background

In 2010, intactivists (activists against infant circumcision) began an initiative to put a measure on San Francisco's November 2011 ballot that would ban all non-medically necessary circumcisions of minors. The effort was spearheaded by intactivist group Bay Area Intactivists, which used a bill whose text was written by Matthew Hess, the founder of San Diego-based intactivist website MGMbill.org (MGM being an acronym for "male genital mutilation", a term used by some intactivists to denounce circumcision). Hess also published Foreskin Man, a comic about a superhero who fights circumcisers and saves babies from them. In the comic, which currently has seven issues, superhero Foreskin Man battles enemies and saves boys from circumcisions in a variety of situations including hospital circumcisions, religious circumcisions, and tribal circumcisions.

Plot 

Foreskin Man's alter ego is Miles Hastwick, a former corporate scientist now curator of the Museum of Genital Integrity. He is adamantly against the practice of circumcision. In the first issue, Hastwick comes up with the alter ego of Foreskin Man to fight against practitioners of circumcision and "the pro-circumcision lobby," whom he feels have gained too much power through "all of the well connected doctors and lawyers." In the second issue, Foreskin Man encounters and fights a "Monster Mohel". In the third issue of the comic, he teams up with a female heroine, dubbed "Vulva Girl," who fights to oppose female genital mutilation. Together, they travel to Kenya to stop tribal circumcisions.  In the fourth issue, he travels to Turkey to prevent the teenage son of a belly dancer from receiving an Islamic circumcision. The fifth issue shows him battling against the head of a company that collects foreskins for use in cosmetics and, in the sixth issue, he goes to the Philippines to disrupt a tuli rite.

Accusations of anti-semitism

In the second issue of the comic, Foreskin Man attends a brit milah and battles a "Monster Mohel". (Brit milah refers to a Jewish circumcision ceremony, while mohel refers to a Jewish ritual circumciser.) This imagery drew criticism from both sides of the circumcision debate. Abby Porth of the Jewish Community Relations Council called the comic "deeply alarming" and pointed out that "Monster Mohel" was portrayed in a way that resembled images used by the Nazis in anti-Semitic propaganda. The American Civil Liberties Union of Northern California argued in an amicus brief against the ban that Foreskin Man was evidence that the initiative was actually motivated by anti-Semitism. Nancy Appel of the Anti-Defamation League stated that the comic had "polarized and isolated, and that people who may have been willing to hear their side are just disgusted".

In addition to being denounced by defenders of circumcision, Foreskin Man was also criticized by activists against the practice. Lloyd Schofield, the leader of the initiative to place the circumcision ban on the ballot, called the comic "a distraction at best", described it as "inflammatory and 180 degrees different from the direction we want to go in", and had wanted Hess to remove it from MGMBill.org.

In response to criticism, Hess asserted that his comic did not focus on Judaism; rather, it dealt with a variety of settings and circumcisers including circumcisions performed by doctors, religious circumcisions, and tribal circumcisions.

References

External links

American comic strips
Circumcision debate
Comics about politics
Satirical comics